High Impact may refer to:

 High Impact (album), a 2009 album by Yngwie Malmsteen
 High Impact Games, videogame company